Richard Specht (7 December 1870, Vienna – 19 March 1932) was an Austrian lyricist, dramatist, musicologist and writer. 

Specht is most well known for his writings on classical music, and in his time was seen as a leading music journalist.  He was a great authority on the music of Gustav Mahler, and in later life became a regular acquaintance of his widow, Alma Mahler-Werfel.

He was, amongst other things, a contributor to the Wiener Illustrierten Extrablatts and other Viennese newspapers.  From 1910, he worked at the Merker publishing house.  In 1925, he was appointed to a professorship at the institution that is now the University of Music and Performing Arts, Vienna.

Works

Fiction 
 Gedichte (1893)
 Das Gastmahl des Plato, Drama (1895)
 Pierrot bossu, Drama (1896)
 Mozart, twelve poems (1914)
 Florestan Kestners Erfolg, a story (1929)
 Die Nase des Herrn Valentin Berger, Drama (1929)

Academic works 
 Johann Strauss II (1909)
 Gustav Mahler (1913)
 Das Wiener Operntheater - Fifty years of memories (1919)
 Die Frau ohne Schatten - Introduction to the music (1919)
 Richard Strauss and his work (1921)
 Julius Bittner (1921)
 Emil Nikolaus von Reznicek - A preliminary study (1922)
 Arthur Schnitzler - The poet and his work.  A study (1922)
 Wilhelm Furtwängler (1922)
 Franz Werfel (1926)
 Johannes Brahms: Leben und Werk eines deutschen Meisters (1928; English translation by Eric Blom)
 Giacomo Puccini. Das Leben, der Mensch, das Werk (1931; English translation, 1933)

External links
 

19th-century Austrian people
Austrian male writers
Austrian lyricists
Austrian musicologists
Austrian Jews
Writers from Vienna
1870 births
1932 deaths
Mahler scholars
Brahms scholars